Newsome is a surname, and may refer to:

Alex Newsome, rugby union player
Bree Newsome, American activist and filmmaker
Craig Newsome (born 1971), American football player
Dazz Newsome (born 1999), American football player
Detrez Newsome (born 1994), American football player
Dick Newsome (1909–1965), American baseball player
Greg Newsome II (born 2000), American football player
Jon Newsome (born 1970), English footballer
Ljay Newsome (born 1996), American baseball player
Kevin Newsome (born 1991), American football player
Ozzie Newsome (born 1956), former American football player
Paula Newsome, American actress
Peter Newsome (glass sculptor) (born 1943), English glass sculptor
Tawny Newsome (born 1983), American musician, comedian, and actress

See also
Newsome, a village in England
Joe E. Newsome High School